Holly Theatre is a historic theater in Dahlonega, Lumpkin County, Georgia, US, which was constructed as a movie theater in 1948, and is currently operated as a non-profit theatrical venue. It puts on performances of musicals and straight plays, generally five mainstage productions a season, and a varying number of children's shows. 

Between shows, it hosts concerts and community events, and can be rented for events. Additionally, it provides acting and dance classes for children and adults. It seats 256 on the main level and an additional 50 in the balcony. The building listed on the National Register of Historic Places in 2002.

See also
National Register of Historic Places listings in Lumpkin County, Georgia

References

External links
Holly Theatre website

National Register of Historic Places in Lumpkin County, Georgia
Theatres completed in 1948
Buildings and structures in Lumpkin County, Georgia